Mahakaal is a 2008 Bengali film directed by Swapan Ghosal.

Background

Mahakaal is a revenge story based on the Anil Kapoor and Madhuri Dixit starring movie Parinda. Indira Dhar, playing the role of a college student who falls in love with Prosenjit (Joy), debuted in this film.

Plot
Prof. Ajoy Mukherjee and his wife Aditi witness a murder, committed by the vociferous criminal Digbijay. In spite of repeated warnings from Digbijay and his right hand Loha the couple testifies against them and they go to jail for seven years. After coming out Djgbibay turns out to be even stronger and proceeds to attack Ajoy's family. He sends a man called Binod Sharma who pretends to be a friend of Joy, Ajoy's brother. Digbijay and Binod conspire against Joy and Ajoy. After sending his own man to rob Joy of two lack rupees, Binod compels Joy to do a murder. In the meantime Digbijay fatally stabs Ajoy frames Joy for the murder. Local inspector Dilip Lahiri also turns out to be a peer of Digbijay. While Joy remains in police custody, Digbijay rapes and murders Joy's younger sister Dia. After all these incidents Aditi commits suicide. Joy teams up with his friends Kanchan and Kumar to seek revenge. They kill Binod, Dilip, Loha, and Digbijay one after the other and are consequently jailed for five years.

Cast
 Prasenjit as Joy Mukherjee
 Indira Dhar as Ratri
 Tapas Paul as Ajay Mukherjee
 Laboni Sarkar as Aditi Mukherjee
 Rajatava Dutta as Vinod Sharma
 Kaushik Banerjee as Digvijay Pradhan
 Pushpita Mukherjee as Dia Mukherjee
  Kanchan Mullick as Kanchan Mallick
 Sumit Gangopadhyay as Loha
 Rajesh Sharma as ACP Dilip Lahiri
 Ashim Roy Chowdhury as Joy's friend
 Ramen Roy Chowdhury as police commissioner

Soundtrack
"Ei Mon Jodi Jeto Go Dekha" - Shreya Ghoshal, Babul Supriyo
"Ektu Dekha" - Udit Narayan, Shreya Ghoshal 
"Jiboner Ei Poth" - Shaan, Mahalaxmi Iyer, N/A
"Lachak Machak" - N/A

References

External links
www.telegraphindia.com preview

2008 films
2000s Bengali-language films
Bengali-language Indian films
Bengali remakes of Hindi films